The Ezop Range is a range of mountains in far North-eastern Russia. Administratively it belongs partly to Amur Oblast and partly to the Khabarovsk Krai of the Russian Federation. 

The range is part of the Ezop / Yam-Alin volcanic zone.

Geography
The Ezop is a range in northeastern Siberia, located in the eastern end of Amur Oblast and the southwestern side of Khabarovsk Krai. It is part of the Yankan - Tukuringra - Soktakhan - Dzhagdy group of mountain ranges. 

The Selemdzha River has its sources in the range.
To the north of the mountain chain rises the Selemdzha Range running roughly parallel to it. The northern end of the Turan Range meets the southern slopes of the range from the south. At the eastern end rise the Yam-Alin and Dusse-Alin ranges, which run in a north/south direction in Khabarovsk Krai. To the southwest lies the Zeya-Bureya Lowland.

Flora 

See also
Northeast Siberian taiga
Palearctic realm
Temperate coniferous forest

References

External links
Gorny Journal, 1905

Mountain ranges of Amur Oblast
Mountain ranges of Khabarovsk Krai
Mountain ranges of Russia